LMIA may refer to:
Labour Market Impact Assessment as issued by Service Canada
Late Minoan IA period of the Minoan civilization
Leck mich im Arsch, canon by Wolfgang Mozart